The 2000–01 Serie A season was the 67th season of the Serie A, the top level of ice hockey in Italy. Nine teams participated in the league, and Asiago Hockey won the championship by defeating HC Milan in the final.

First round

Second round

Final round

Qualification round

Playoffs

External links
 Season on hockeyarchives.info

2000–01 in Italian ice hockey
Serie A (ice hockey) seasons
Italy